Cliff or Clifford Jones may refer to:
 Cliff Jones (computer scientist) (born 1944), British computer scientist
 Cliff Jones (English footballer), footballer for Gainsborough Trinity and Burnley
 Cliff Jones (Welsh footballer) (born 1935), Wales international footballer
 Cliff Jones (rugby union) (1914–1990), Wales rugby international captain
 Cliff Jones (musician) (born 1968), British music producer and lead singer of Gay Dad
 Clifford A. Jones (1912–2001), Lieutenant Governor of Nevada
 Clifford L. Jones (1927–2008), Pennsylvania Republican Party chairman
 A. Clifford Jones (1921–1996), American politician in Missouri